Coro Coro Municipality is the first municipal section of the Pacajes Province in the  La Paz Department, Bolivia. Its seat is Coro Coro.

See also 
 Ch'alla Jawira
 Janq'u Qalani
 Muxsa Willk'i
 Q'ilani

References 
 www.ine.gov.bo / census 2001: Coro Coro Municipality

External links 
 Map of the Pacajes Province

Municipalities of La Paz Department (Bolivia)